Raffaele Cadorna (9 February 1815 – 6 February 1897) was an Italian general who served as one of the major Piedmontese leaders responsible for the unification of Italy during the mid-19th century.

Born in Milan, Cadorna entered the Piedmontese military academy at Turin in 1832. Joining the engineer corps in 1840, he commanded a volunteer engineer battalion in Lombardy from March 1848 until August 1849 during the Italian War of Independence.

Serving with the Piedmontese forces in January 1855 during the Crimean War, Cadorna won distinction during the Second War of Independence at the Battle of San Martino and was awarded the rank of Colonel in 1859.

Cadorna was appointed Minister of War to the republican regime of Tuscany that same year, and served as a lieutenant general and corps commander during the Seven Weeks War, leading successful operations against the Austrians in the Friuli campaign from June to July 1866.

Later leading the invasion of the Papal States, Cadorna's capture of Rome on September 20, 1870, finally completed the unification of Italy, and for this service he was named a Senator the following year. Retiring from public life soon after, lived in Tuscany until his death in 1897.

His son Luigi Cadorna rose to the rank of Field Marshal and served as Italian chief of staff during part of World War I, while his grandson Raffaele Cadorna Jr. was a general and commander of the Italian resistance during World War II.

References

1815 births
1897 deaths
Military personnel from Milan
Italian generals
People of the Revolutions of 1848
Members of the Senate of the Kingdom of Italy
People of the Second Italian War of Independence
Military personnel of the Crimean War
People of the Third Italian War of Independence